The impact of the COVID-19 pandemic on funerals, as with the impact of COVID-19 on ICUs, is a burgeoning stressor on the funeral industry necessitating changes in its own logistics, and more particularly within its ambit on ritual in general. The CDC has provided broad guidelines.

References 

Impact of the COVID-19 pandemic on religion